The Apple Valley Transit Station is a transit facility located in Apple Valley, Minnesota. It is owned by the City of Apple Valley and the MVTA. The transit station is near Cedar Avenue and Gaslight Drive. This station has 337 parking spaces and is almost full almost each weekday. It also serves the nearby communities of Lakeville and Farmington.

As part of the Metro Red Line BRT, the transit station was relocated. A construction groundbreaking ceremony took place on April 14, 2009 and an opening ceremony took place on January 7, 2010. This location was originally a Menards location when it opened in 1986, then in 1998 it became a recreational store called Watson's and it became this transit station.

The station's parking structure was originally 3 stories tall but was expanded in 2019 to 5 stories tall.

Bus connections
Note: Route 420 is a reservation route and runs local service to Rosemount. Route 440 makes connections to Metro Transit Route's 22 (Minneapolis/Brooklyn Center) and 515 (66th Street/Richfield Commons/Southdale Mall) @ VA Medical Center and to BlueXpress Route's 491A (East Shakopee/Southbridge/Dakotah Parkway) and 492 (Downtown Prior Lake/Eagle Creek) @ Cedar Grove. Route 480A is non-stop along Palomino Drive, 127th Street and Galaxie Avenue and by-passes Burnsville via "A" terminal letter trips going Northbound to the Eagan Transit Station & St. Paul Union Depot.

 Route 420 (147th Street / 145th Street / Rosemount Community Center / Rosemount Transit Station)
 Route 440 (Southport Shopping Center / 153rd Street / Garrett Ave / 147th Street Station / Pennock Ave / 140th Street Station / Eastview High School / Johnny Cake Ridge Road / Minnesota Zoo / County Road 38 / Palomino Hills / Nichols Road / Cedar Grove / VA Medical Center)
 Route 442 (Mall of America / Cedar Grove  / Palomino Hills / Whitney Drive / Garden View Road / Apple Valley Community Center / Evergreen Drive / Fairview Ridges Hospital / Burnsville Center)
 Route 447 (County Road 42 / Burnsville Center / Savage Park & Ride / Prior Lake / Mystic Lake Casino)
 Route 475 (Downtown Minneapolis / Lake Street I-35W Station / Cedar Grove / Minnesota Zoo / University of Minnesota (Coffman, Anderson, Wiley & Cooke) / Ridder Arena / TCF Bank Stadium / Stadium Village METRO Green Line LRT Station)
 Route 477 (Downtown Minneapolis / Lake Street I-35W Station / Palomino Hills / 157th Street Station / Lakeville Cedar)
 Route 480A (St. Paul Union Depot / Eagan Transit Station / Palomino Hills / Blackhawk)

See also
 Other Transit Facilities

References

External links
 Transit Stations/Park & Ride - MVTA

Bus stations in Minnesota